is a private junior women's college in Fukuoka, Fukuoka, Japan, established in 1958.

External links
 Official website

Japanese junior colleges
Educational institutions established in 1958
Private universities and colleges in Japan
Universities and colleges in Fukuoka Prefecture
1958 establishments in Japan